The 1945–46 season was the 44th in the history of the Western Football League.

This was the first season of the Western League since it was suspended at the end of the 1939–40 season due to World War II. The champions for the fifth time in their history were Bristol Rovers Reserves. For the following season, more clubs joined and the league was once again divided into two divisions.

Final Table
The league consisted of fourteen clubs: eight clubs continued from the 1939–40 season and they were joined by six new clubs:

Bristol Rovers Reserves, rejoining after leaving the league in 1939.
Clandown, rejoining after leaving the league in 1922.
Clevedon, rejoining after leaving the league in 1914.
Douglas, rejoining after leaving the league in 1921.
Soundwell
Yeovil Town Reserves, rejoing after leaving the league in 1939 as Yeovil and Petters United Reserves.

References

1945-46
4